

Moritz von Drebber (12 February 1892 – 30 May 1968) was a general in the Wehrmacht of Nazi Germany during World War II who commanded the 297th Infantry Division. He was a recipient of the Knight's Cross of the Iron Cross.

Drebber surrendered the division on 25 January 1943 during the Battle of Stalingrad.  He then sent a letter to Friedrich Paulus stating "he and his soldiers were well received by the Red army."  Drebber also asked Paulus to "give up the useless resistance and to surrender with the whole army." He joined the National Committee for a Free Germany while in captivity. He was released in 1949.

Awards and decorations

 Knight's Cross of the Iron Cross on 30 June 1942 as Oberst and commander of Infanterie-Regiment 523

References

Citations

Bibliography

 

1892 births
1968 deaths
People from Oldenburg (city)
People from Oldenburg (state)
Major generals of the German Army (Wehrmacht)
German Army personnel of World War I
Recipients of the clasp to the Iron Cross, 1st class
Recipients of the Gold German Cross
Recipients of the Knight's Cross of the Iron Cross
German prisoners of war in World War II held by the Soviet Union
German commanders at the Battle of Stalingrad
National Committee for a Free Germany members
Military personnel from Oldenburg (city)